This is a list of some famous Armenians in Syria.

Politics and military
Sarkis Assadourian (born 1948, Aleppo), former member of Canadian Parliament
Samuel Der-Yeghiayan (born 1952, Aleppo), United States federal judge, noteworthy for being the first Armenian immigrant to become a federal judge in the United States
Varoujan Garabedian (born 1954, Qamishli), former member of the ASALA, linked with the 1983 Orly Airport attack
Jacobo Harrotian (fl. 19th century, Aleppo – 1929 Dominican Republic), Mexican General officer of Armenian descent who participated in the Mexican Revolution
Garo Kahkejian (1963, Aleppo – 1993, Magauz near Martakert), Armenian military commander and participant of the First Nagorno-Karabakh War, buried in the Yerablur Pantheon
Aram Karamanoukian (1910–1996), lieutenant-general of the Syrian army
Hrant Maloyan (1896–1978), General Commander of the Internal Security Forces in Syria
Vartan Oskanian (born 1954, Aleppo), Minister of Foreign Affairs of Armenia 1998– 008
Sarkis Soghanalian (1929, Alexandretta – 2011, Hialeah, Florida), Lebanese-American international private arms dealer from Syria, nicknamed The Merchant of Death
Levon Ter-Petrossian (1946, Aleppo), President of Armenia 1991–1998

Religion
Karekin I Sarkissian (1932, Kesab – 1999, Vagharshapat), catholicos of All Armenians 1994–1999, and catholicos of the Great House of Cilicia 1983–1994 as Karekin II
Zareh I Payaslian (1915, Marash – 1963, Beirut), catholicos of the Great House of Cilicia 1956–1963; served as Primate of Aleppo 1943–1956

Literature, history and journalism
Garnik Addarian (1925, Aleppo – 1986, Beirut), Armenian Diasporan poet
Kevork Ajemian (1932, Manbij – 1998, Lyon), prominent writer, journalist, novelist and public activist, one of the founders of ASALA
Hagop Barsoumian (1936, Aleppo – 1986, Beirut), Armenian scholar and Armenologist, Ph.D. in Ottoman History
Antranig Chalabian (1922, Kesab – 2011, Southfield, Michigan), US-based Armenian historian, medical illustrator and cartographer
Seta Dadoyan (born in Aleppo), Lebanon-based Armenian scholar, Doctor of Sciences in Philosophy focusing on the history of Armenian philosophy
Antranig Dzarugian (1913, Gürün – 1989, Beirut), Armenian Diasporan novelist and poet of the 20th century, raised and educated in Aleppo
Bedros Hadjian (1933, Jarabulus – 2012, Buenos Aires), Buenos Aires-based Armenian contemporary writer and journalist
Rizqallah Hassun (1825, Aleppo – 1880, London), Syrian-Armenian poet and the founder of the first newspaper written solely in Arabic, Mirat al-ahwal, in 1855
Moushegh Ishkhan (1914, Sivrihisar – 1990, Beirut), Armenian Diasporan poet of the 20th century, raised and educated in Damascus
Harry Koundakjian (1930–2014), Syrian-born American news photographer, photojournalist and photo editor
Vahan Kurkjian (1863, Aleppo – 1961, New York), Armenian author, historian and teacher, publisher of Loussaper Armenian newspaper in 1904 in Cairo
Harut Sassounian (born 1950, Aleppo), Armenian-American writer and political analyst, publisher of The California Courier
Simon Simonian (1914, Ayntab – 1986, Beirut), Aleppo-raised and educated Armenian writer, public activist and teacher, founder of the Spurk Journal in 1958 in Beirut
Hrag Vartanian (born in Aleppo), Brooklyn-based Armenian-American contemporary writer, critic and cultural worker
Manvel Zulalian (1929, Aleppo – 2012, Yerevan), academic Armenian historian, Armenologist, and professor of the Armenian State Pedagogical University, Ph.D. in Oriental studies

Sciences
Roger Altounian (1922, Aleppo – 1987), Syrian-born Anglo-Armenian physician and pharmacologist who pioneered the use of sodium cromoglycate as a remedy for asthma

Engineering and Architecture
Kevork Yeramian (1949 – 2009, Aleppo), Aleppo-born Syrian-Armenian architect and interior designer with major contributions to the Armenian community in Aleppo, including the Aram Manougian Complex, the Armenian theaters of Aleppo, Syria, and various Armenian genocide monuments.

Sports
Kevork Mardikian (born 1957, Latakia), football trainer and one of the best Syrian footballers of all time, played during the 1970s and 1980s
Mardik Mardikian (born 1992, Latakia), current member of Syria national football team, son of trainer Kevork Mardigian

Music, theatre and drama
George Tutunjian (1930, Aleppo – 2006, Montreal), Armenian patriotic songs performer
Aram Tigran (1934, Qamishli – 2009, Athens), Armenian singer among Kurds who sang primarily in Kurdish and Armenian
Karnig Sarkissian (born 1953, Aleppo), contemporary performer of Armenian revolutionary songs
Paul Baghdadlian (1953, Aleppo – 2011, Glendale, California), worldwide Armenian singer
Haig Yazdjian (born 1959, Aleppo), Greece-based Syrian-Armenian composer, vocalist and oud player
Arsen Grigorian (Mro) (born 1968, Qamishli), Armenian traditional songs performer
Avraam Russo (born 1969, Aleppo), born as Apraham Ipjian, Syrian-Armenian singer in Russia
Raffi Ohanian (born 1989, Aleppo), contemporary singer, 2009–2010 winner of Hay Superstar TV hit show of the Idol series in Armenia

Visual arts
Jean Carzou (1907, Aleppo – 2000, Marsac-sur-l'Isle, Dordogne), French-Armenian painter from Syria
Yousuf Karsh (1908–2002), Armenian Canadian portrait photographer
Shahen Khachatrian (born 1934, Aleppo), artist and art expert, founding director of Arshile Gorky Museum in Vagharshapat

Business and public activism
Giovanni Anastasi (1780, Damascus – 1860, Alexandria), wealthy merchant and antiquarian, served as Swedish-Norwegian consul-general in Alexandria from 1828 until his death
Charles A. Agemian (1909, Aleppo – 1996, Neptune City, New Jersey), nationally known Armenian-American banker
Albert A. Boyajian (born 1940, Aleppo), American business leader and activist for Armenian causes
Vatche Arslanian (1955, Aleppo – 2003, Baghdad), member of the Canadian Red Cross and head of logistics for the ICRC in Iraq during the 2003 invasion of Iraq
Jack Kachkar (born 1964, Damascus), Armenian Canadian businessman

Entertainment
Arto Der Haroutunian (1952, Aleppo – 1987, England), British-Armenian cook, restaurateur, architect, painter, poet and translator
DJ Sedrak (1963, Aleppo – 2008, Yerevan), TV presenter and the first radio-DJ in Armenia, born as Setrag Davidian
Charla Baklaian Faddoul (23 July 1976, Aleppo, Syria), reality star who appeared on The Amazing Race 5 and The Amazing Race: All-Stars with her cousin Mirna

See also
 Armenians in Syria
 List of Armenians

Armenian
 
Armenia–Syria relations
Syrian
Armenian